Bir Çocuk Sevdim (English title: The Girl I Loved) is a Turkish drama television series produced by Turkish Media Corporation (TMC Film) starring Bülent İnal, Çetin Tekindor, Gülcan Arslan and Hakan Kurtaş. It premiered on September 9, 2011 and ended on June 18, 2012.

Plot 
Turan and Esmahan have three children: Emine, the unmarried oldest daughter, Erdal, a silly son and Mine, the younger daughter who is beautiful and romantic. They seem to have a happy middle class family, notwithstanding some issues arising from Emine being jealous of Mine and being unable to get married.
Mine is in love with Sinan, a young man from a rich family. Sinan has just finished his university and is planning to go America for further studies. Mine and Sinan are deeply in love with each other and they don't care about their different family backgrounds and want to live together in harmony for a long time. Neither Mine's, nor Sinan's, parents know about their relationship. However, a shopkeeper from Mine's neighbourhood catches Mine sitting with Sinan in his car and tells her father, Turan. As Mine comes from a conservative family, this makes Turan furious and he visits Mine's college. Her class fellows tell Turan that Mine hasn't come to college for the past few days. Turan confronts Mine and warns her to be careful. After a few days later, Mine leaves to visit Sinan at his home, where she meets his father. She overhears the conversation between Sinan and his father, who was telling him that Mine is not on their standard and Sinan deserves someone better. Mine is disheartened hearing this and leaves without telling Sinan. When she comes back home, her father is furiously waiting for her, as it is midnight. He yells at her asking her where she had been, and she faints. Her family takes her to the hospital where they come to know that Mine is pregnant with Sinan's child. This leaves Mine's family furious and very upset.
Mine's father takes her phone away and locks her in her room when she refuses to tell him who the father of the child is. Sinan keeps trying to contact Mine by calling her and messaging her.

Cast

International broadcasts

References

External links 
 

2011 Turkish television series debuts
2012 Turkish television series endings
Turkish drama television series
Kanal D original programming
Star TV (Turkey) original programming
Television shows set in Istanbul
Television series produced in Istanbul
Television series set in the 2010s